Franz Magnis Suseno, S.J., or Maria Franz Anton Valerian Benedictus Ferdinand von Magnis (born 26 May 1936) is a German-born Indonesian Jesuit priest and philosopher.

Biography

Father Franz Magnis-Suseno SJ, a Jesuit priest, is professor emeritus at Driyarkara School of Philosophy in Jakarta, its former rector for 11 years. Born 1936 in Eckersdorf, [Lower Silesia, then Germany], and was originally called Graf Franz Ferdinand von Magnis. He has lived in Indonesia since 1961 and in 1977 became an Indonesian citizen, taking the name of Franz Magnis-Suseno. He studied philosophy, theology and political science in Pullach, Yogyakarta and Munich, 1973 he got a doctorate in philosophy from the University of Munich. For many years he lectured also at Jakarta's Universitas Indonesia and at Catholic University Parahyangan in Bandung. He has been guest lecturer at several places in Europe. In 2002 he received a honorary doctorate in theology from the University of Luzern.
He has published mainly in the field of ethics, political philosophy, Javanese worldview and philosophy of God, mostly in Indonesian language. 
In 2001 he received the Großes Verdienstkreuz des Verdienstordens der Bundesrepublik Deutschland. In 2007 he turned down the Bakrie Award because of the Sidoarjo mud flow. He received a Habibie award for interfaith dialogue  and in 2015 the Mahaputera Utama award.

References 

1936 births
Living people
People from Kłodzko County
People from the Province of Lower Silesia
20th-century German Jesuits
Indonesian Christians
Indonesian Jesuits
Indonesian philosophers
Indonesianists
Naturalised citizens of Indonesia
German emigrants to Indonesia
Indonesian people of German descent
Commanders Crosses of the Order of Merit of the Federal Republic of Germany